Van de Kamp or Van der Kamp is a Dutch toponymic surname. A kamp originally was a fenced / enclosed piece of land. Notable people with the surname include:

Anna van der Kamp (born 1972), Canadian rower
Auke van de Kamp (born 1995), Dutch volleyball player
Guido van de Kamp (born 1964), Dutch footballer
Harry van der Kamp (born 1947), Dutch singer
John Van de Kamp (1936–2017), Los Angeles District Attorney and Attorney General of California
Johannes van der Kemp (1747–1811), Dutch military officer, doctor, philosopher and also  South African missionary.
Marion van de Kamp (1925–2022), German actress and television announcer
Peter van de Kamp (1901–1995), Dutch astronomer

Fictional characters 
Bree Van de Kamp from the Desperate Housewives television series, which also included Rex Van de Kamp (her husband), Andrew Van de Kamp (son), Danielle Van de Kamp (daughter), and Phyllis Van de Kamp (mother-in-law)

See also
1965 van de Kamp, asteroid
Van de Kamp's, bakery founded in 1915 in Los Angeles by Theodore J. Van de Kamp
Van de Kamp's, a frozen battered seafood brand spin-off
Van de Kamp Bakery Building, designed to resemble a Dutch 16th century farmhouse
Van Kamp

Dutch-language surnames
Surnames of Dutch origin
Dutch toponymic surnames